Ladbech is a railway town and archaeological site in northern Tunisia. It is part of Toujane, one of the Matmata mountain villages located in the Medjerda valley, outside of Bou Salem.

References

Communes of Tunisia
Populated places in Béja Governorate
Cities in Tunisia